In Greek mythology, Phrenius (Ancient Greek: Φρένιος) was a name shared by two suitors of Penelope who came from Zacynthus along with other 42 wooers. Both of them were killed by Odysseus with the aid of Eumaeus, Philoetius, and Telemachus.

Notes

Reference 

 Apollodorus, The Library with an English Translation by Sir James George Frazer, F.B.A., F.R.S. in 2 Volumes, Cambridge, MA, Harvard University Press; London, William Heinemann Ltd. 1921. ISBN 0-674-99135-4. Online version at the Perseus Digital Library. Greek text available from the same website.

Suitors of Penelope